Pleasant Township is one of the fourteen townships of Madison County, Ohio, United States.  The 2000 census found 3,282 people in the township, 1,417 of whom lived in the unincorporated portions of the township.

Geography
Located in the southeastern corner of the county, it borders the following townships:
Fairfield Township - north
Darby Township, Pickaway County - east
Monroe Township, Pickaway County - southeast
Madison Township, Fayette County - south
Range Township - west
Oak Run Township - northwest

The village of Mount Sterling is located in southeastern Pleasant Township.

Name and history
It is one of fifteen Pleasant Townships statewide.

Government
The township is governed by a three-member board of trustees, who are elected in November of odd-numbered years to a four-year term beginning on the following January 1. Two are elected in the year after the presidential election and one is elected in the year before it. There is also an elected township fiscal officer, who serves a four-year term beginning on April 1 of the year after the election, which is held in November of the year before the presidential election. Vacancies in the fiscal officership or on the board of trustees are filled by the remaining trustees.

References

External links
County website

Townships in Madison County, Ohio
Townships in Ohio